Defending champion John McEnroe defeated Björn Borg in the final, 7–6(7–4), 6–1, 6–7(5–7), 5–7, 6–4 to win the men's singles tennis title at the 1980 US Open. It was his second major singles title. The final is often ranked among the best matches in tennis history. It was the first successful men's singles US Open title defense in the Open Era.

Seeds
The seeded players are listed below. John McEnroe is the champion; others show the round in which they were eliminated.

  Björn Borg (finalist)
  John McEnroe (champion)
  Jimmy Connors (semifinalist)
  Guillermo Vilas (fourth round)
  Vitas Gerulaitis (second round)
  Gene Mayer (first round)
  Harold Solomon (fourth round)
  Eddie Dibbs (second round)
  Peter Fleming (second round)
  Ivan Lendl (quarterfinalist)
  Roscoe Tanner (quarterfinalist)
  José Luis Clerc (first round)
  Brian Gottfried (fourth round)
  Wojtek Fibak (quarterfinalist)
  Yannick Noah (fourth round)
  Victor Amaya (third round)

Draw

Key
 Q = Qualifier
 WC = Wild card
 LL = Lucky loser
 r = Retired

Finals

Section 1

Section 2

Section 3

Section 4

Section 5

Section 6

Section 7

Section 8

References

External links
 Association of Tennis Professionals (ATP) – 1980 US Open Men's Singles draw
1980 US Open – Men's draws and results at the International Tennis Federation

Men's singles
US Open (tennis) by year – Men's singles